The 1978 Swedish Grand Prix was a Formula One motor race held on 17 June 1978 at the Scandinavian Raceway. It was the eighth race of the 1978 World Championship of F1 Drivers and the 1978 International Cup for F1 Constructors, and the last Formula One Swedish Grand Prix to date.

The 70-lap race was the only race to feature the Brabham BT46B "fan car", with which Niki Lauda took a commanding victory. Riccardo Patrese finished second in an Arrows, with Ronnie Peterson third in a Lotus.

Race summary
Responsible for the Brabham win was clever thinking by Brabham's Gordon Murray, who was trying to eclipse Colin Chapman's ground effect invention on the Lotus 79, the skirted car that had swept the front row since its debut at Zolder. Center of the new Brabham BT46B concept was a large fan which drew air through the engine water radiator which was mounted horizontally over the engine. The fan also took ground effect to a higher level (at least engineering-wise) by sucking air from under the car, creating a partial vacuum and creating an enormous amount of downforce. The car appeared to contravene a rule which stated that moving aerodynamic devices were not allowed, but Brabham argued that the rules had been worded to ban devices whose primary function was aerodynamic. As the fan also cooled the engine, Brabham claimed that this, not aerodynamics, was its primary function.

Its legality was soon protested, but it was allowed to race, John Watson and Niki Lauda qualifying 2nd and 3rd behind the Lotus 79 of Mario Andretti (the two drivers did this as to not draw attention to the remarkable advantage that the fan would provide, qualifying on full tanks and in the words of Lauda 'doing our best to avoid pole').

At the start Andretti retained the first place, while Lauda got ahead of Watson; on the second lap he was passed by a fast Riccardo Patrese in the Arrows, and on the third he was passed by the other Lotus of Ronnie Peterson too; the Swede also passed Patrese, but had later to back off due to a tyre puncture. The order then remained the same until lap 20, when Watson was forced to retire by a throttle problem.

At the front, Lauda and Andretti were battling for first place, until the American made an error and was forced to let the Austrian through, and eventually dropped out due to a broken valve on his engine. Once Jean-Pierre Jabouille dropped oil onto the track, the Brabham was in a race of its own, seemingly unaffected by the slippery surface. In Lauda's biography, To Hell And Back, he wrote that, whilst other cars had to reduce speed to drive carefully over the oil, the Brabhams could simply accelerate (as the fan was activated by the gearbox to get around regulations, this meant that higher speed produced much higher grip) through the affected parts of the track. Lauda went on to win by a huge 34.6 seconds despite according to Lauda 'trying not to show how dominant the car really was', followed by Patrese and Peterson in a close finish; the remaining points went to Patrick Tambay, Clay Regazzoni and Emerson Fittipaldi.

After the race, the stewards deemed the car legal. Later, the FIA investigated the car, and corroborated Brabham's claim that the fan's primary effect was to cool the car, meeting the letter, if not the spirit, of the rules. The car was judged to have been legal as raced and the Brabham victory stood, but the car never raced again. It is popularly thought that it was banned, but it was actually voluntarily withdrawn by Brabham. This was arguably done by team owner Bernie Ecclestone to avoid a conflict with the other privately owned teams, whose support he needed. 1978 was the year that Ecclestone became chief executive of the Formula One Constructors' Association and led it through the FISA–FOCA war that would lead to the downfall of FISA and give FOCA the right to negotiate television contracts for the Grands Prix, effectively giving Ecclestone commercial control of Formula One which continued for several decades.

Classification

Qualifying 

*Positions in red indicate entries that failed to qualify.

Race

Championship standings after the race 

Drivers' Championship standings

Constructors' Championship standings

Note: Only the top five positions are included for both sets of standings.

References

Swedish Grand Prix
Swedish Grand Prix
Grand Prix
Swedish Grand Prix